is the 32nd single by Japanese singer/songwriter Chisato Moritaka. Written by Moritaka and Yuichi Takahashi, the single was released by One Up Music on June 11, 1997. The song was used by Lawson for their store commercials. The B-side is "Mirai", which was used at the 54th National Sports Festival in Moritaka's hometown of Kumamoto.

Background 
Being a fan of the Beatles, Moritaka fulfilled a life-long dream with "Sweet Candy" by recording her drum tracks at Abbey Road Studios. The music video was also filmed in parts of London during the recording sessions.

Moritaka performed the song on the 48th Kōhaku Uta Gassen, which was her sixth and final appearance on the annual New Year's Eve special.

Chart performance 
"Sweet Candy" peaked at No. 10 on Oricon's singles chart and sold 93,000 copies.

Other versions 
Moritaka re-recorded the song and uploaded the video on her YouTube channel on July 23, 2012. This version is also included in Moritaka's 2013 self-covers DVD album Love Vol. 1.

Track listing 
All lyrics are written by Chisato Moritaka; all music is arranged by Yuichi Takahashi.

Personnel 
 Chisato Moritaka – vocals, drums
 Yuichi Takahashi – guitar, keyboards
 Shin Hashimoto – piano, keyboard
 Yukio Seto – guitar, bass
 Nobuyuki Mori – tenor saxophone, baritone saxophone
 Wakaba Kawai – trombone
 Futoshi Kobayashi – trumpet
 Shiro Sasaki – trumpet

Chart positions

References

External links 
 
 
 

1997 singles
1997 songs
Japanese-language songs
Chisato Moritaka songs
Songs with lyrics by Chisato Moritaka
One Up Music singles